Luciano Martino (22 December 1933 – 14 August 2013) was an Italian film producer, director and screenwriter.

Biography
Born in Naples, the brother of the director and screenwriter Sergio Martino, he was active in the cinema industry since the early fifties. 

After several credits as screenwriter and assistant director he made his directorial debut with the eurospy film Secret Agent Fireball. Among the screenplays he collaborated The Whip and the Body by Mario Bava, Arizona Colt by Michele Lupo and the Lamberto Bava's giallo Delirium.  In the seventies he produced and co-wrote a long series of successful commedie sexy all'italiana including Quel gran pezzo dell'Ubalda tutta nuda e tutta calda, Giovannona Long-Thigh and The School Teacher, which launched the career of Edwige Fenech, with whom he was engaged at the time. With the decline of the genre he focused on television, producing TV series and television films.

Death
Martino died of a pulmonary edema in his house in Malindi, Kenya.

Selected filmography (as producer) 

 Who Hesitates Is Lost (1960)
 The Warrior Empress (1960)
 Flashman (1967)
 Madame Bovary (1969)
 The Strange Vice of Mrs. Wardh (1971) a.k.a. Blade of the Ripper
 The Case of the Scorpion's Tail (1971)
 All the Colors of the Dark (1972)
 Your Vice Is a Locked Room and Only I Have the Key (1972)
 The Case of the Bloody Iris (1972)
 My Horse, My Gun, Your Widow (1972)
 The Violent Professionals (1973)
 The Mountain of the Cannibal God (1978)
 The Great Alligator River (1979)
 Island of the Fishmen (1979)
 Concorde Affaire '79 (1979)
 Eaten Alive! (1980)
 Cannibal Ferox (1980)
 The Scorpion with Two Tails (1982)
 Ironmaster (1983)
 A Blade in the Dark (1983)
 2019, After the Fall of New York (1983)
 Blastfighter (1984)
 Miami Golem (1985)
 Hands of Steel (1986) a.k.a. Fists of Steel, a.k.a. Atomic Cyborg

References

External links 
 

1933 births
2013 deaths
Italian film directors
Italian film producers
Italian screenwriters
Italian male screenwriters
Writers from Rome
Giallo film directors